Arish Kumar is an Indian actor who has appeared in Tamil language films. Arish made his debut in Kasthuri Raja's coming-of-age film, Idhu Kadhal Varum Paruvam, where he played a youngster infatuated with an older woman played by Kiran Rathod. He made his breakthrough as an actor with a leading role in Rasu Madhuravan's Goripalayam (2010) and has often appeared in films with several lead actors.

Career 
The son of editor Kumar of Ganesh-Kumar who worked in films directed by K. Balachander, He later appeared in two leading roles in consecutive films directed by Rasu Madhuravan. His first release was Goripalayam (2010), where he portrayed a disobedient youngster, and then he later appeared in Muthukku Muthaaga (2011), where he was paired opposite Oviya. In both films, he appeared as one of the four main lead actors. A further multi-starrer film, Netru Indru (2014), was his next release.

Personal life 
In June 2015, Harish married Abinaya, a doctor, at the Guruvayoor temple in Kerala. In December 2017, the couple divorced due to undisclosed reasons.

Filmography 
Actor

References

External links 

Indian male film actors
Male actors in Tamil cinema
Living people
21st-century Indian male actors
Year of birth missing (living people)